Groat is a surname. Notable people with the surname include:

 Dick Groat (born 1930), former two-sport athlete
 Nikkie Groat (21st century), Miss Teen USA 2005 delegate
 Robert B. Groat (1888–1959), American printer, publisher, and politician

See also
 Groat Bridge
 Groat Road
 Groat's Island
 John o' Groats